Polycera parvula is a species of sea slug, a nudibranch, a shell-less marine gastropod mollusc in the family Polyceridae.

Distribution 
This species was described from Point Danger, Torquay, Victoria, Australia. It occurs from New South Wales to central Victoria.

References

Polyceridae
Gastropods described in 1958